Tchirozerine is a department of the Agadez Region in Niger. Its capital lies at the city of Tchirozerine. As of 2011, the department had a total population of 328,018 people.

It is divided administratively into the following communes:
Communes urbaines (urban commune) : Tchirozérine, Agadez (the capital of the Agadez Region)
Communes rurales (rural communes): Aderbissinat, Dabaga, Ingall, Tabelot

References

Departments of Niger
Agadez Region